13 teams took part in the league with CSKA Moscow winning the championship.

League standings

Results

Top scorers
14 goals
 Vsevolod Bobrov (CDKA Moscow)
 Valentin Nikolayev (CDKA Moscow)
 Sergei Solovyov (Dynamo Moscow)

11 goals
 Gaioz Jejelava (Dinamo Tbilisi)
 Vasili Kartsev (Dynamo Moscow)
 Vasili Lotkov (Dynamo Leningrad)

10 goals
 Avtandil Gogoberidze (Dinamo Tbilisi)
 Ivan Komarov (Zenit Leningrad)

9 goals
 Nikolay Dementyev (Spartak Moscow)
 Vladimir Dyomin (CDKA Moscow)
 Dmitri Sinyakov (Krylia Sovetov Kuybyshev)

References

 Soviet Union - List of final tables (RSSSF)

1947
Soviet
Soviet
1